1 Corinthians 4 is the fourth chapter of the First Epistle to the Corinthians in the New Testament of the Christian Bible. It is authored by Paul the Apostle and Sosthenes in Ephesus, composed between 52–55 CE. Paul continues to confront the factionalism of the Corinthian church and describes the role of an apostle.

Text
The original text was written in Koine Greek. This chapter is divided into 21 verses.

Textual witnesses
Some early manuscripts containing the text of this chapter are:
 Papyrus 46 (AD 175–225)
 Codex Vaticanus (325–350)
 Codex Sinaiticus (330–360)
 Codex Alexandrinus (400–440)
 Codex Ephraemi Rescriptus (~450)
 Papyrus 11 (7th century; extant verses 3)
 Papyrus 68 (7th century; extant verses 4:12–17; 4:19–5:3)

Servants of Christ and stewards of the mysteries of God
In verse 1, Paul writes of "us" as servants of Christ and stewards of the mysteries of God. The New Living Translation and the Living Bible paraphrase both specify that "us" refers to Paul and Apollos, continuing from the references to factions within the church which Paul has confronted in the previous chapter. The Weymouth New Testament and Albert Barnes both refer to "us" as "us Apostles". Heinrich Meyer argues differently: "us" meaning "myself and such as I, by which other apostles also and apostolic teachers (like Apollos) are meant. In view of 1 Corinthians 3:22 ("whether Paul or Apollos or Cephas, or the world or life or death, or things present or things to come – all are yours") no narrower limitation is allowable."

The words generally translated as "servants of Christ" could also be translated as "officers" of Christ.

Verse 5

Verse 17 

"I have sent Timothy to you": Out of concern and respect, Paul not only writes, giving his best advice and counsel, promising to come, but, in the meanwhile, sends Timothy (or "Timotheus" in Greek) to the Corinthian church.
"Beloved son": In his epistles, Paul often styles Timothy as his own son in the faith, a dearly beloved son. Paul was not the instrument of his conversion, because Timothy was a disciple of Christ before he knew Paul (Acts 16:1) but either because he was younger than Paul or because of their great affection, he served him in the Gospel (Philippians 2:22) knowing well Paul's methods of doctrine and practice.
"Remind you of my ways": All the preaching, doctrines, rules and orders Paul gave for the "discipline and management of the affairs of churches", which he had formerly delivered to them, were seemingly forgotten by the church. Therefore, Timothy is sent, not to teach new ways, but only to remind them what Paul had formerly taught them.
"In Christ": Paul's doctrines, the sum and substance of them were Christ, what Paul had received from Christ, and such as were agreeably to the mind of Christ.
"As I teach everywhere in every church": Paul's plan of doctrine and discipline was the same in every place.

See also 
 Apollos
 Jesus Christ
 Timothy
 Related Bible parts: Acts 16, Philippians 2

References

Bibliography

External links 
  King James Bible – Wikisource
 English Translation with Parallel Latin Vulgate
 Online Bible at GospelHall.org (ESV, KJV, Darby, American Standard Version, Bible in Basic English)
 Multiple bible versions at Bible Gateway (NKJV, NIV, NRSV etc.)

04